The 2013 Florida Atlantic Owls football team represented Florida Atlantic University in the 2013 NCAA Division I FBS football season. The Owls were led by at the start of the season by second-year head coach Carl Pelini. However Pelini and defensive coordinator Rekstis resigned on October 30 after admitting they were at a local party where pot was served.  Brian Wright was promoted and made interim head coach for the remainder of the season. The Owls played their home games at FAU Stadium. This season was the Owls' first as a member of Conference USA in the East Division.

Schedule

Awards and honors
Mid-season awards and honors
 Week 3 Conference USA Player of the Week, Defense: D'Joun Smith (DB, Jr.)
 Week 6 Conference USA Player of the Week, Offense: Jaquez Johnson (QB, Jr.)
 Week 10 Conference USA Player of the Week, Defense: D'Joun Smith (DB, Jr.)
 Week 12 Conference USA Player of the Week, Defense: Christian Milstead (DB, Jr.)

Post-season awards and honors
 Conference USA Newcomer of the Year: Jaquez Johnson (QB, Jr.)

All-Conference USA honors
 First Team All-Conference USA: Cory Henry (DL, Sr.)
 D'Joun Smith (DB, Jr.)
 Second Team All-Conference USA:'''
Andrae Kirk (LB, Jr.)
 Sean Kelly (P, So.)

References

Florida Atlantic
Florida Atlantic Owls football seasons
Florida Atlantic Owls football